Area codes 202 and 771 are telephone area codes in the North American Numbering Plan (NANP) for Washington, D.C.

Area code 202 was one of the original NANP area codes established in October 1947 by AT&T. After the State of New Jersey with area code 201, the District of Columbia was the second numbering plan area (NPA). An NPA that comprises an entire state received a code in which the second digit was "0". Area code 771 was added as a second area code to the numbering plan area in April 2021 to create an all-services overlay.

History
Since the creation of the North American Numbering Plan (NANP) in 1947, most of the inner ring of the Washington metropolitan area has been a single local calling area, the Washington Metropolitan Exchange Area (WMEA). This is despite the fact that the WMEA was split between three numbering plan areas (NPAs): the District's 202, 301 in southern Maryland, and 703 in Northern Virginia. From the 1950s to 1990, it was possible to complete local calls in the WMEA with only seven digits. The entire WMEA was reachable via long-distance services by dialing area code 202, for which purpose AT&T Long Lines had established cross-referenced operator routing codes for all affected central offices. This scheme was implemented via a system of central office code protection, in which central offices in the three numbering plan areas could not duplicate any central office prefixes for any of the three area codes in the WMEA. If a 1-202-574 number was in use in the District, the corresponding 1-703-574 number or 1-301-574 number could only be assigned to jurisdictions a safe distance from the metropolitan area, such as southwestern Virginia or the Eastern Shore of Maryland. Conversely, if a 1-703-552 number was in use in Northern Virginia or a 1-301-552 Maryland suburbs, the corresponding 1-202-552 number could not be used in the District.

By Spring 1990, C&P Telephone (later part of Bell Atlantic and now Verizon), the Regional Bell Operating Company for the District, advised the North American Numbering Plan Administrator (NANPA) that the last interchangeable central office code in the area would be assigned in the second half of the year. The only remaining prefixes could not be assigned without breaking seven-digit dialing in the region, leading C&P to terminate the central office code protection scheme in order to make additional prefixes available for use. This change was implemented in a permissive dialing period from April 1, 1990, to October 1, 1990, at which time all home-NPA (HNPA) local calls maintained seven-digit dialing; all HNPA direct-dialed toll calls, required 1 and ten digits; foreign-NPA (FNPA) local calls were dialed with just the ten-digit number; FNPA direct dialed calls required dialing 1 and ten digits. Operator-assisted calls were all dialed as 0 and ten digits.

The end of central office code protection was intended to allow numbers to be assigned in the Washington area that could not previously be assigned under the previous system. However, it did not provide enough relief to meet demand on either side of the Potomac River.  By the end of 1990, the Chesapeake and Potomac Telephone Company of Maryland realized that 301 was on the brink of exhaustion even with the end of the central office code protection scheme. It filed to assign area code 410 to most of Maryland from the Baltimore area eastward, effective October 5, 1991. In Virginia, the delay amounted to six years, until 1996, when area code 540 was installed for the western portion of the old 703 territory; permissive dialing ended January 27, 1996.

The region's continued growth in the 1990s ultimately led to both suburban area codes being overlaid, with area code 240 overlaying 301 in 1997, and area code 571 overlaying 703 in 2000.

Years after the introduction of mobile number portability, many cell phone customers on the Virginia and Maryland sides of the metro have 202 numbers.

With 202 facing exhaustion in late 2022, the North American Numbering Plan Administrator announced in October 2020 that area code 771 would be added to the numbering plan area of the District of Columbia. The Public Service Commission of the District of Columbia approved a plan to phase in the new area code over a 13-month period. 202 had been one of the few urbanized area codes without an overlay, making Washington one of the largest cities where seven-digit dialing was still possible. The installation of a second area code broke seven-digit dialing for calls within the District. The overlay implementation commenced with a permissive dialing period from April 10, 2021 to October 9, 2021, during which ten-digit dialing of 202-telephone numbers was optional. The first central office code assignments for 771 took place on November 8, 2021 for central office code 777, and on November 9 for 888.

Local calling
Even with the implementation of ten-digit dialing in the Washington metro, much of the Washington area is a toll-free calling zone, one of the largest in the eastern United States, covering large portions of Virginia and Maryland.

Areas such as Alexandria, Arlington, Fairfax, Falls Church, McLean and Tysons in Virginia (Area codes 703 and 571) and Rockville, Gaithersburg, Upper Marlboro, Bethesda and Landover in Maryland (Area codes 301 and 240) are a local call to Washington.

See also
Area code 710
List of North American Numbering Plan area codes

References

External links

202
Telecommunications-related introductions in 1947
202
Washington, D.C.